Didrik Tønseth (also spelled Toenseth, born 10 May 1991) is a Norwegian cross-country skier and runner. He has competed in the World Cup since the 2011–12 season.

He represented Norway at the FIS Nordic World Ski Championships 2015 in Falun. Known for his classic technique, Tønseth proved to be equally adept at freestyle, proving this in the 30 km where he was the sole Norwegian with a shot at a medal. He narrowly lost the final sprint to Canadian Alex Harvey, and came fourth. He skied the second leg of the relay, earning him a gold medal after Northug's strong finish.

In athletics, he represented his country at the 2019 European Cross Country Championships, finishing 24th in the senior race.

Cross-country skiing results
All results are sourced from the International Ski Federation (FIS).

Olympic Games
 1 medal – (1 gold)

World Championships
2 medals – (2 gold)

World Cup

Season standings

Individual podiums

4 victories – (3 , 1 )
17 podiums – (10 , 7 )

Team podiums

 2 victories – (2 ) 
 8 podiums – (8 )

References

External links
 
 
 
 

1991 births
Living people
Sportspeople from Trondheim
Norwegian male cross-country skiers
Norwegian male cross country runners
Norwegian male long-distance runners
Olympic cross-country skiers of Norway
Olympic gold medalists for Norway
Olympic medalists in cross-country skiing
Cross-country skiers at the 2018 Winter Olympics
Medalists at the 2018 Winter Olympics
FIS Nordic World Ski Championships medalists in cross-country skiing
Tour de Ski skiers
21st-century Norwegian people